David Hambardsumyan (June 24, 1956, in Kapan – January 11, 1992, in Yerevan) was an Armenian diver, who twice became European champion. He was a bronze medalist at the 1980 Summer Olympics, and 16 times champion of the USSR. Hambartsumyan died on January 11, 1992, due to cardiac arrest.

References

Sources
Olympic Obituaries - 1992. Citius, Altius, Fortius. Vol. 1 No. 2, Spring 1992.
 David Hambardzumyan Olympic medals and stats. databaseOlympics.com

1956 births
1992 deaths
People from Kapan
Armenian male divers
Soviet male divers
Divers at the 1972 Summer Olympics
Divers at the 1976 Summer Olympics
Divers at the 1980 Summer Olympics
Olympic divers of the Soviet Union
Olympic bronze medalists for the Soviet Union
Olympic medalists in diving
Soviet Armenians
Medalists at the 1980 Summer Olympics
Universiade medalists in diving
Universiade silver medalists for the Soviet Union

Ethnic Armenian sportspeople